Ikukunitama Shrine (生國魂神社, Ikukunitama jinja) is a Shinto shrine located in Tennōji-ku, Osaka Prefecture, Japan. Its main festival is held annually on September 9. It was formerly an imperial shrine of the first rank (官幣大社, kanpei taisha) in the Modern system of ranked Shinto Shrines.

External links

Official website
Osaka's Ikukunitama Shrine set to revive ritual for first time in 70 years

Shinto shrines in Osaka
Beppyo shrines
Kanpei-taisha